Separating column may refer to:

 A fractionating column
 A column containing ion-exchange resin